Satyam  is a 2003 Indian Telugu-language romantic drama film directed by debutant Surya Kiran and produced by actor Nagarjuna under Annapurna Studios banner. The film stars Sumanth and Genelia D'Souza in lead roles. The film received positive reviews and was very successful at the box-office. Released on 19 December 2003, it was one of the biggest box-office successes in Sumanth's career and it was also Genelia's debut in Telugu cinema.  Chakri  won the Filmfare Award for Best Male Playback Singer – Telugu. It was remade in Bengali as Shakti.

Plot
Satyam is an aspiring songwriter who  inadvertently gets misunderstood both by his father Vishwanath and his love interest Ankita. He ghostwrites for a selfish and popular film lyricist. He decides to prove himself as an independent songwriter before expressing his love to Ankita. In the meantime, a classmate of Ankita proposes to her. Through all of this, Ankita's father Shankar, unexpectedly befriends Satyam without his daughter's knowledge. Satyam eventually overcomes his obstacles and succeeds in reconciling with his father and Ankita.

Cast

 Sumanth as Satyam
 Genelia D'Souza as Ankita
 Kota Srinivasa Rao as Shankar
 Bramhanandam as Lingam
 Rajesh as Satish Petla
 Tanikella Bharani as Chakradhar
 Raghava Malladi  as Vishwanath
 Kondavalasa as Simhadri
 Varsha as Swati
 Sridhar as Prakash
 Narsing Yadav as MLA
 Duvvasi Mohan as Chakradhar's assistant
 Kanta Rao (Cameo appearance)
 Chakri as himself (Cameo appearance)
 Raghava Lawrence as himself (Special appearance in 'Kuch Kuch' song)

Box-office
The film ran successfully for 50-days in 163 centers, and also completed its 100-day run in over 26 centers.

Soundtrack

Music was composed by Chakri.

References

External links 
 

2003 films
2000s Telugu-language films
2000s romantic musical films
Indian romantic drama films
Indian romantic musical films
2003 romantic drama films
Films scored by Chakri
Telugu films remade in other languages